Erik Wolpaw is an American video game writer. He and Chet Faliszek wrote the pioneering video game website Old Man Murray. He subsequently worked for game developers Double Fine Productions and Valve, and is known for his work on video games including Half-Life 2, Psychonauts, Portal, Portal 2 and Half-Life: Alyx.

Career 
As a high-school student Wolpaw wrote two type-in program games for the Atari 8-bit family that Antic published in 1983 and 1984. From 1997 to 2002, Wolpaw and Chet Faliszek wrote the video game-oriented website Old Man Murray. The site was highly influential in video game writing and game journalism. He also wrote for GameSpot.

He subsequently worked at Double Fine Productions as a writer for Psychonauts. In 2006, he won the Game Developers Choice Award for Best Writing for his story and dialogue contributions to Psychonauts. In 2004, Wolpaw joined Valve, where he and Faliszek wrote for games such as Half-Life 2: Episode One, Half-Life 2: Episode Two, Portal and Portal 2. He left Valve in February 2017 to write for Psychonauts 2, though he ended up not working on it. In January 2019, he confirmed that he had returned to Valve as a part-time contractor on Artifact and Half-Life: Alyx.

Personal life 
In 2004, Wolpaw was diagnosed with ulcerative colitis. Expecting his condition to require a departure from the company, he spoke with managing director Gabe Newell, who surprised him by offering an extended leave with pay. "Your job is to get better," Newell said. "That is your job description at Valve. So go home to your wife and come back when you are better."

Works

See also
 List of people diagnosed with ulcerative colitis

References

External links
 Erik Wolpaw on Mobygames
 Erik Wolpaw on official Team Fortress wiki

Living people
American people with disabilities
Place of birth missing (living people)
Year of birth missing (living people)
Valve Corporation people
Video game writers
Double Fine people